Sindh Baloch Cooperative Housing Society (SBCHS) most commonly known as Sindh Baloch Society is a major housing society located in the southeastern area within Block 12 of Gulistan-e-Johar in Karachi, Sindh, Pakistan.

Although part of Karachi City, Sindh Baloch Society is actually governed directly by the Faisal Cantonment Board. The Cantonment Board Faisal (CBF) is responsible for municipal services on the land, now contains the society, which was decided in the early 1980s through a presidential order. The society has 650 houses with four different plot size areas which are as follows, R is 120 sq yds, R1 is 160 sq yds, A is 200 sq yds and B is 400 sq yds. Next to the society is Safari Comforts apartments which shares one side of the boundary wall with the society.

References

Neighbourhoods of Karachi